Vojnici is a village in the municipality of Babušnica, Serbia. "Vojnici" means "soldiers" in Serbian. According to the 2002 census, the village has a population of  104 people.

References

Populated places in Pirot District